The 1996 St. John's Red Storm men's soccer team represented St. John's University during the 1996 NCAA Division I men's soccer season and the 1996 Big East Conference men's soccer season. The Red Storm play their home games at Belson Stadium as a member of the Big East Conference. They were led by head coach Scott Jackson, in his fifth year as head coach.

Regular season

Results

|-
!colspan=6 style=""| Regular season
|-

|}

1996
1996 Big East Conference men's soccer season
1996 in sports in New York City
1996
1996
American men's college soccer teams 1996 season
1996 NCAA Division I Men's Soccer Tournament participants